The Maltese Government 2022–2027 is the incumbent Government of Malta (Il-Gvern ta' Malta) as from 30 March 2022. The Maltese government is elected through a General Election for a five-year term. The Head of Government is Robert Abela. The Labour Party (Partit Laburista) won a majority following a general election which was held on 26 March 2022. The cabinet and parliamentary secretaries for this legislature were initially sworn in on 30 March 2022.

Cabinet

Parliamentary Secretaries

References

2020s in Malta
Government of Malta
Cabinets established in 2022
2022 establishments in Malta
Current governments